The 1975 All-Ireland Minor Football Championship was the 44th staging of the All-Ireland Minor Football Championship, the Gaelic Athletic Association's premier inter-county Gaelic football tournament for boys under the age of 18.

Cork entered the championship as defending champions, however, they were defeated by Kerry in the Munster final.

On 28 September 1975, Kerry won the championship following a 1-10 to 0-4 defeat of Tyrone in the All-Ireland final. This was their eighth All-Ireland title overall and their first in twelve championship seasons.

Results

Connacht Minor Football Championship

Quarter-Final

Roscommon 9-13 Leitrim 1-7 Carrick-on-Shannon.

Semi-Finals

Mayo 1-10 Sligo 0-10 Sligo.

Sligo 7 points Galway in Tuam.

Final

Roscommon 1-13 Galway 0-5 Tuam.

Leinster Minor Football Championship

Munster Minor Football Championship

Ulster Minor Football Championship

All-Ireland Minor Football Championship
Semi-Finals

Final

References

1975
All-Ireland Minor Football Championship